Lifehouse Elements is a single CD sampler of the 6-CD Box Set The Lifehouse Chronicles released by Pete Townshend in 2000. The song "New Song" is not found in the box set. The CD was released 23 May 2000 in the US by Redline Entertainment.

Track listing

References

Sampler albums
The Who
2000 compilation albums
Pete Townshend compilation albums